Mitchel Dennis Bergkamp (born 10 September 1998) is a Dutch footballer who plays as a midfielder for Bromley.

Career
Bergkamp started his career with Dutch fourth tier side Jong Almere City, helping them earn promotion to the Dutch third tier. In 2020, he trialed for the youth academy of Arsenal in the English Premier League.

Before the second half of 2020–21, Bergkamp joined the youth academy of English second tier club Watford. In 2022, he signed for Bromley in England.

Personal life
He is the son of Netherlands international Dennis Bergkamp.

References

External links
 

Living people
1998 births
Dutch footballers
Association football midfielders
Tweede Divisie players
Derde Divisie players
Watford F.C. players
Bromley F.C. players
Dutch expatriate footballers
Dutch expatriate sportspeople in England
Expatriate footballers in England